Sargam Koushal (born 20 September 1990) is an Indian model and teacher who won the title of Mrs. World 2022.

Personal life 
She was born on 20 September 1990 to GS Kaushal and Meena Kaushal in Jammu and Kashmir.

She completed her schooling at Saint Marry's Presentation Convent Senior Secondary School of Gandhi Nagar Jammu, graduated from Women's College, Jammu, and earned a master's degree in English Literature from the University of Jammu. She also has a B.Ed. degree from Government B.Ed. College Jammu. She married Aditya Manohar Sharma on 3 December 2017 who works in Indian Navy. She worked as teacher in Visakhapatnam. After her marriage, she chose and found her passion to compete in and as a beauty pageant. Her father is a retired Chief Manager at Bank of India and her husband is Lieutenant Commander in Indian Navy.

Competition 
Sargam won the title of Mrs India in June 2022 at the pageant held by Mrs India Inc. In 2022 Mrs. World competition, she beat 63 contestants from different countries. The competition was held in Las Vegas, Nevada. Shaylyn Ford, 2021 Mrs. World presented crown to her. In the final competition she wore pink gown and accessories like beautiful crystal earrings. Her costume was designed by Bhawna Rao.

References

External links 

Living people
1990 births
People from Jammu and Kashmir
Women from Jammu and Kashmir
Models from Jammu and Kashmir
Female models from Jammu and Kashmir
People from Visakhapatnam
Mrs. World winners